Killing Addiction is a deathgrind band that originated in the Ocala, Florida, music scene of the late 1980s and early 1990s. Their style is based in politically and philosophically charged themes combined with musical influences that span death metal (Death, Possessed, Morbid Angel, Atheist), grindcore (Napalm Death, Carcass), and thrash (Slayer, Sacred Reich, Kreator).

Biography

1989-1992

In 1989, Chris Wicklein and brothers Chad and Pat Bailey formed Killing Addiction, in Ocala, Florida, and thus became one of the few bands of the time to help introduce death metal to the central Florida area. In 1990, they were joined by drummer Chris Ballina, and their first official studio recording was underway.  This recording was entitled Legacies of Terror, the four-song demo tape, recorded at Titan Studios, which played a fundamental role in establishing their presence in the underground tape-trading and fanzine scene.

As a result of the Legacies recording, the following year saw the release of their Necrosphere 7-inch vinyl EP, on Seraphic Decay records - a label responsible for initiating many early, successful death metal bands, such as Incantation, Gorephobia, Derketa, Sinister, and many more.  Like Legacies, this next recording was also made at the local Titan Studios, but included some atmospheric keyboard arrangements that nudged their style in new directions.  Necrosphere was the final recording with Chris Ballina, who left the band to pursue other interests.

In 1992, Chris York joined as the band's new drummer, and after only two months with York, Killing Addiction recorded the full-length, debut Omega Factor, for the short-lived JL America Records.  Although Omega Factor was recorded in 1992, it was originally intended to be released on a start-up death metal label from the UK.  However, after the recording was complete, all contact from the label ceased and nothing more was ever heard from them.  The band was then left with a full-length album and no label to release it.

1993-1994

Soon after recording Omega Factor, the band established contact with the new label JL America, and a deal was quickly made.  After being worked into the production schedule, Omega Factor was released in early 1993, and distributed by Relativity. To support this recording, the band performed live throughout the north, central, and south Florida areas, with popular death metal acts such as Obituary, Atheist, Incantation, and Resurrection, and early genre underground favorites such as Assuck, Paineater, Incision, and Equinox.  After the demise of JL America came the band's independent 1994 release, Dark Tomorrow, which was a split EP with fellow Floridians Eterne De Sade. This became Killing Addiction's last recording during the formative years of Floridian death metal, as Chris York parted ways for personal reasons, and the remaining members decided, at the time, the band had run its course.  However, before their departure in early 1994, Killing Addiction was voted the Best North Florida Band at the 4th Annual Tampa Bay Metal Awards (September, 1993).

2006- 

In early 2006, after 12 years of silence, Killing Addiction reformed ready to pick up where they left off.  Their first studio effort to return to the scene was Fall of the Archetypes, released as a full-length album on Xtreem Music (Spain), and as a limited-edition, six-song EP.  Archetypes was recorded at DOW Studios (which also produced Morbid Angel's Heretic album), in Sefner, Florida, and Aeon Studios, in Ocala, Florida.  This recording included Gabriel Lewandowski as the band's new drummer.  Although some of their music's basic elements remained, there was a deliberate effort to modernize some aspects of their sound.  The result was a faster, more aggressive style and songs that demonstrated improved musicianship and arrangement.

No live performances were undertaken until November 2013, which also saw the return of former drummer Chris York.  Since then, the band has shared the stage with Obituary, Exhumed, Gruesome, DRI, Destruction, Warbringer, Jungle Rot, Druid Lord, Exmortus, and many others.  In September 2014, Killing Addiction recorded a two-song EP entitled When Death Becomes An Art, independently released on CD, which was also licensed as a 7-inch EP on Inverse Dogma Records (Italy) in early 2015.  This venture was recorded and produced by Ray Helton at Helton Music, Ocala, Florida, and demonstrates a return to a musical style closer to the trademark sound of  Omega Factor, albeit with the improved musical aspects of Fall of the Archetypes.

Early 2016 saw a return to studio work, which led to the release of the Shores of Oblivion four-song EP, by Xtreem Music, also licensed for a vinyl edition by Inverse Dogma Records. Founding member/guitarist Chad Bailey died on September 25, before the official release date of Shores of Oblivion.  His absence left a personal and creative void as the remaining members moved forward together.  Shores of Oblivion drew much praise from press and fans being named among the Best of 2016 by the well-known YouTube channel Infidel Amsterdam, and being voted Best EP of 2016 at Metal-Rules.com.

In November, 2016, ex Brutal Enemy and Magpits guitarist Mike Serden joined to help keep the band moving forward. A re-issue of Omega Factor was released by Xtreem Music on March 9, 2018 - the 25th anniversary date of the original release in 1993.

The band's third album, and first studio album in 11 years, Mind of a New God was released on June 1, 2021.

Discography
Studio albums
Omega Factor, 1993, JL America Records; reissue by XTREEM Music, 2018
Fall of the Archetypes, 2010, XTREEM Music
Mind of a New God, 2021, XTREEM Music

Extended plays
Necrosphere, 1991, Seraphic Decay Records
Dark Tomorrow, 1994, split EP
When Death Becomes An Art, 2015, Inverse Dogma Records
Shores of Oblivion, 2016, XTREEM Music; vinyl release by Inverse Dogma Records, 2017

Compilations
Brutal Aggression, 1993, JL America Records
Kiss of Death, 1995, EETME Records

Demos
Legacies of Terror, 1990

Line-up

Current members
Pat Bailey - vocals, bass (1989–1994, 2006–present)
Chris Wicklein - guitars (1989–1994, 2006–present)
Chris York - drums (1992–1994, 2013–present)
Devon McDonough - guitars (2020–present)

Past members
Mike Serden - guitars (2016–2018)
Chad Bailey - guitars (1989–1994, 2006–2016; died 2016)
Gabriel "Gabe" Lewandowski - drums (2009–2010)
Chris Ballina - drums (1989–1992)

References

American death metal musical groups